Freddy's Dead: The Final Nightmare (also known as A Nightmare on Elm Street 6: The Final Nightmare) is a 1991 American slasher film and the sixth film in the A Nightmare on Elm Street franchise. It is a sequel to A Nightmare on Elm Street 5: The Dream Child and was originally intended to be the final installment of the series; Wes Craven's New Nightmare was released three years later but takes place outside the series canon. A canonical crossover/sequel, Freddy vs. Jason, was released in 2003. This was New Line Cinema's first 3D film release.

Directed by Rachel Talalay from a screenplay by Michael De Luca, Freddy's Dead: The Final Nightmare stars Lisa Zane, Yaphet Kotto, Breckin Meyer, Shon Greenblatt, Ricky Dean Logan, Lezlie Deane, Tobe Sexton, and Robert Englund as Freddy Krueger. Additionally, several well-known actors make cameo appearances, including: Johnny Depp (whose screen debut was in the original film), Roseanne Barr, Tom Arnold, and Alice Cooper. Iggy Pop sings the title song, which plays during the end credits over a montage of scenes from the previous films in the series.

Freddy's Dead: The Final Nightmare was released on September 13, 1991, and grossed $34.9 million in the US on a budget of $9–11 million, surpassing its predecessor's gross. It was panned by critics upon release.

Plot
Set "ten years from now", Freddy Krueger has returned and killed nearly every child and teenager in the town of Springwood, Ohio. The only surviving teenager, John Doe, is confronted by Freddy in a dream. John wakes up just outside the Springwood city limits but, due to a head injury, does not remember who he is or why he is there.

At a shelter for troubled youth, three of the residents—Spencer, an affluent stoner who is resisting his dad's attempts to get him to conform; Carlos, a troubled kid who was physically abused by his mother to the point of becoming deaf in one ear; and Tracy, a tough girl who was sexually abused by her father—plot to run away to California. The police find John and take him to the shelter, where he becomes a patient of Dr. Maggie Burroughs. Maggie notices a newspaper clipping from Springwood in John's pocket. To attempt to cure John's amnesia, she plans a road trip to Springwood. In an attempt to run away, Tracy, Carlos, and Spencer stow away in the van, but they are discovered when John has a hallucination and almost wrecks the van just outside Springwood.

Tracy, Spencer, and Carlos attempt to leave Springwood but not before stopping to rest at the abandoned 1428 Elm Street house. John and Maggie visit the Springwood orphanage and discover that Freddy had a child. John believes he is that child because Freddy allowed him to live. Back on Elm Street, Carlos and Spencer fall asleep and are killed by Freddy. Tracy is almost killed, but is awakened by Maggie. John, who went into the dream world with Tracy to try to help Spencer, is still asleep. Maggie and Tracy take John back to the shelter. On their way back, Krueger attacks John in his dream. Before killing John, Krueger reveals that his child is a girl; as John dies, he tells this to Maggie. Tracy and Maggie return to the shelter, but they find that no one remembers John, Spencer, or Carlos except for Doc, who has learned to control his dreams. Maggie finds her adoption papers and realizes that she is Freddy's daughter. Her birth name was Katherine Krueger, but her name was changed to Maggie Burroughs when her father was arrested and subsequently murdered.

Doc discovers that Freddy's power comes from dream demons who continually revive him, and that Freddy can be killed if he is pulled into the real world. Maggie decides that she will be the one to enter Freddy's mind and pull him into the real world. Once in the dream world, she puts on a pair of 3D glasses and enters Freddy's mind. In his mind, she learns that Freddy was teased as a child, was abused by his foster father, inflicted self-abuse as a teenager, and murdered his wife when she discovered his murderous tendencies. Freddy was given the power to become immortal by fiery demons. Maggie struggles to pull Freddy into the real world but eventually succeeds.

Maggie and Freddy end up in hand-to-hand combat against one another; she uses several weapons confiscated from patients at the shelter. Enraged by the knowledge of what he has done, Maggie tears off Freddy's clawed glove and stabs him through the stomach with it, embedding the glove's claws into a steel support beam and leaving Freddy suspended above the ground. Tracy tosses Maggie a pipe bomb which she throws into Freddy's chest. The three dream demons, unable to revive him in the real world, fly out of Freddy after the pipe bomb kills him. Tracy, Doc and Maggie rejoice as the latter triumphantly declares "Freddy’s dead."

Cast

 Lisa Zane as Maggie Burroughs / Katherine Krueger
 Cassandra Rachel Freil as Young Maggie Burroughs / Katherine Krueger
 Robert Englund as Freddy Krueger
 Tobe Sexton as Teenage Freddy Krueger
 Chase Schrimer as Young Freddy Krueger
 Lezlie Deane as Tracy Swan
 Shon Greenblatt as John Doe
 Breckin Meyer as Spencer Lewis
 Ricky Dean Logan as Carlos Rodriguez
 Yaphet Kotto as Doc 
 Lindsey Fields as Loretta Krueger (credited as Lyndsey Fields)
 Johnny Depp as Teen on TV (credited as Oprah Noodlemantra).
 Tom Arnold as Childless Man (credited as Mr. Tom Arnold)
 Roseanne Barr as Childless Woman (credited as Mrs. Tom Arnold)
 Alice Cooper as Edward Underwood
 Elinor Donahue as Orphanage woman
 Robert Shaye as Ticket seller

Production

Development
The previous five installments of the Elm Street franchise had considerably helped the finances of New Line Cinema that it earned the nickname "The House that Freddy Built" but the studio had also begun to develop other franchises (for example Critters and, by 1990, Teenage Mutant Ninja Turtles). Bob Shaye recalled in the Never Sleep Again documentary in 2010 that "frankly it was time to move on and we had other projects we wanted to focus on". The decision was made to make the sixth entry the final film in the Elm Street series. Director Rachel Talalay had produced most of the previous installments and was keen to helm the sixth film as its director; she also had a number of ideas that would help refresh the series including not calling the title Nightmare on Elm Street Part 6 and incorporating more humor into this entry which she felt was lacking from the previous film. The production of Freddy's Dead coincided with the original airing of Twin Peaks which was later acknowledged as an influence on the film with its more surreal humorous aspects. Elements of this can be seen throughout the film including Freddy using a version of the Nintendo Power Glove to control Spencer's character and dragging a bed of spikes to impale John Doe in a manner reminiscent of a Hanna-Barbera cartoon.

In the original script, 15-year-old Jacob Johnson (son of the previous installment's main character Alice Johnson) is the major character, and many of the dream warriors from A Nightmare on Elm Street 3: Dream Warriors  return to aid Jacob in defeating Freddy after he kills Alice. This idea was later discarded. Peter Jackson also wrote a screenplay that was not used; his story was about teenagers who did not see Freddy as a threat and took sleeping pills to enter Freddy's world. Jackson's script also included a police officer put into a comatose state to permanently be in Freddy's realm.

John Carl Buechler was the chief special make-up effects artist for the film, returning to the series after serving the same role in A Nightmare on Elm Street 4: The Dream Master. He also contributed to the film's 3-D "Freddyvision" climax.

The last ten minutes of the film are in 3D. To cue the audience to put on their 3D glasses, Maggie is seen to put on her 3D glasses in the film. The effect was eliminated for the VHS, Blu-ray, and television releases, with the exception of the UK and French rental version and the US LaserDisc version. The DVD box set released in 1999 reinstated the 3D effect and included two pairs of 3D glasses. Rachel Talalay revealed that whilst the film was being processed in 3D, the lab developing the print accidentally sent them a two-second clip from the then-unreleased Terminator 2: Judgment Day.

Editing
Unlike its predecessor, there was relatively little editing of violent sequences as mandated by the MPAA. Rachel Talalay noted that the original cut of the film was long and, as a result, several sequences were either removed or significantly shortened (a total of around 47 minutes of footage was removed from the final print of the film).

The work-print for Freddy's Dead is available online and includes much of the deleted material. This includes Maggie discussing her nightmares with her mother, more dialogue between Doc and Tracy, additional footage of the Springwood Fair and the discovery of Freddy's basement lair. Rachel Talalay suggested that the reason the footage was removed was so the audience could "get to Freddy quicker". Some of the more disturbing elements of John's first nightmare were also trimmed down.

Music
Warner Bros. Records released the film soundtrack on September 24, 1991. Although not included on the soundtrack, the song "In-a-Gadda-Da-Vida" by Iron Butterfly is featured in the film.

 Goo Goo Dolls – "I'm Awake Now"
 Junk Monkeys – "Everything Remains the Same"
 Goo Goo Dolls – "You Know What I Mean"
 Johnny Law – "Remember the Night"
 Chubb Rock – "Treat 'em Right"
 Iggy Pop – "Why Was I Born? (Freddy's Dead)"
 Johnny Law – "Hold Me Down"
 Goo Goo Dolls – "Two Days in February"
 Young Lords – "Give Me a Beat"
 Fates Warning – "Nothing Left to Say"

On September 3, 1991, Varèse Sarabande released an album of Brian May's score.

Release

Marketing
As a publicity stunt for both Freddy's Dead and the comic storylines that were still being released around the film's cinematic release, New Line Cinema held a mock funeral for Freddy Krueger at Hollywood Forever Cemetery  in Los Angeles, including attendants from the film series such as Alice Cooper, Lezlie Deane, Shon Greenblatt, Ricky Dean Logan, Breckin Meyer, Tobe Sexton, Lisa Zane, Lisa Wilcox and Whit Hertford. Andy Mangels and Rachel Talalay were among others present. On encouragement by New Line Cinema, the Los Angeles mayor at the time, Tom Bradley, declared September 13 to be "Freddy Krueger Day", but this move was heavily criticized for glorifying a mass murderer, with Robert Englund adding that "we have to separate crime reality from movie escapism".

Reception

Box office
Freddy's Dead: The Final Nightmare made $12.9 million in its opening weekend, which was the highest opening weekend of the series until the release of Freddy vs. Jason and the biggest September opening at the time, ranking number 1 at the box office. In its second weekend it made $6.6 million and remained in the top spot, before falling to number 7 in its third weekend. After its initial run, the film grossed $34.9 million in the United States and Canada, making it the fifth-highest-grossing film in the series.

Critical response
The film holds a 23% positive rating on film review aggregator website Rotten Tomatoes based on 35 reviews, with an average rating of 4.00/10. The site's critical consensus reads, "Reducing the once-terrifying Dream Reaper into a goofy caricature, this joyless climax will leave audiences hoping Freddy stays dead." Austin Chronicle wrote, "Freddy Krueger ... has devolved from the horrific, ill-defined phantasm posited in the original film, into a bland and annoyingly predictable boogeyman loved by kids everywhere."

The song "Why Was I Born? (Freddy's Dead)", written for the film, was nominated for a Golden Raspberry Award for Worst Original Song. In the 2010 documentary Never Sleep Again, Lisa Zane commented that she had submitted a Bond-esque ballad called "The Worst Is Over" for use over the end credits but "Why Was I Born" was chosen instead. Director Rachel Talalay had worked with Iggy Pop on the 1990 film Cry-Baby and offered him the chance to compose a song for the film.

Other media

Comic books
Innovation Publishing published a three-issue comic adaptation of the film. An alternate version of the third issue was published in 3D to recreate the effect used in the film. The series was also published in trade paperback format. Innovation followed the adaptation with A Nightmare on Elm Street: The Beginning, which served as a direct sequel to Freddy's Dead: The Final Nightmare. In the sequel, Maggie Burroughs continues to have nightmares of her father, Freddy Krueger. Burroughs travels back to Springwood with Tracy, another survivor from the film, to research Freddy's life leading up to his death at the hands of the Springwood parents. Only the first two issues of the series were released before Innovation Publishing declared bankruptcy. The third issue went unpublished, and the story remains incomplete. Series writer Andy Mangels made the original script for the third issue available on his website.

See also
 List of ghost films
 List of monster movies

References

External links

 
 
 
 

1991 films
1991 horror films
1990s 3D films
Nightmare Elm Street 6
American teen horror films
American 3D films
American sequel films
1990s English-language films
American slasher films
Films about amnesia
Films about child abuse
Films about dysfunctional families
Films about nightmares
Films produced by Aron Warner
Films set in the 1950s
Films set in the 1960s
Films set in the 1970s
Films set in the future
Films set in 1999
Films set in Ohio
Insomnia in film
A Nightmare on Elm Street (franchise) films
Adaptations of works by Wes Craven
Patricide in fiction
Uxoricide in fiction
Films directed by Rachel Talalay
Films adapted into comics
Films scored by Brian May (composer)
1990s teen horror films
1991 directorial debut films
New Line Cinema films
1990s American films